Aki or AKI may refer to:

Places in Japan
Aki District, Hiroshima, a district in Hiroshima Prefecture
Aki, Kōchi, a city in Kochi Prefecture
Aki District, Kōchi, a district in Kochi Prefecture
Aki, Ōita, a town in Ōita Prefecture
Aki Province, a former province, part of what is today Hiroshima Prefecture
Aki Station, a rail station in Aki, Kōchi

Gaming
Syn Sophia, a video game developer, formerly AKI Corporation
Aki, a mahjong video game

As an acronym
Acute kidney injury
Anti Knock Index of motor fuel

People and fictional characters
Aki (name), a list of people and characters with the surname, given name, nickname or stagename
Princess Aki (Akihime) of Japan

Other uses
Japanese battleship Aki, an early 20th century battleship of the Imperial Japanese Navy

See also
, Canadian Coast Guard hovercraft
Akis (disambiguation)